The Porapora languages (alternatively the core Grass or Porapora River languages) are a pair of closely related languages in the Ramu language family, Gorovu and Adjora (Abu), spoken along the border of East Sepik Province and Madang Province in Papua New Guinea. Foley classifies them as part of the Grass group of languages, but Usher break up the Grass languages.
Foley (2018) included Aion (Ambakich) as well,
but it has since been shown to be one of the Keram languages.

Phonemes
Usher (2020) reconstructs the consonant inventory as follows:

{| 
| *m || *n ||  || *ŋ
|-
| *p || *t || *s || *k 
|-
| *mb || *nd || [*ndz] || *ŋg 
|-
| *w || *ɾ || *j || *ɣ
|}
Vowels are *i *ʉ *u *a.

Pronouns
Usher (2020) reconstructs the pronouns as:
{| 
! !!sg!!du!!pl
|-
!1
| *[ŋg]u || *aŋgʉ || *ani
|-
!2
| *ŋu || *uŋgʉ || *uni
|-
!3
| *mV || ? || *mV-nʉ
|}
Adjora has 1sg na, but that derives from an oblique form.

References

External links 
 Timothy Usher, New Guinea World, Proto–Porapora River

 
Tamolan–Ataitan languages
Languages of Madang Province
Languages of East Sepik Province